Kilkea and Moone is a barony in County Kildare, Republic of Ireland.

Etymology
The barony takes its name from the villages of Kilkea (Cill Cathaigh, "Cathac's church") and Moone (Maen Colmcille, "Colm Cille's property").

Location

Kilkea and Moone is located in southern County Kildare, reaching from Mullaghmast to the southern tip of the county, east of the Barrow and west of Sherriff Hill.

History
Kilkea and Moone was the ancient lands of the Dál Chormaic.

Dál Chormaic - barony of Kilkea and Moone, represented by Uí Gabla, Uí Labrada, Uí Buide, and Cuthriage. The parts of Leinster belonging to the Clann Cormaic are Cuthraighe, Ua Trena, Ui Cruinn or Ui Cuinn, Ua Gabla Fine and Ua Gabla Roireann.

St. Abban (Abbán moccu Corbmaic (d.520) was of the Dál Cormaic (Uí Cormaic, along with his sister St. Gobnait.

List of settlements

Below is a list of settlements in Kilkea and Moone:
Castledermot
Kilkea
Moone

References

Baronies of County Kildare